Mandog is a 1972 BBC children's television science fiction serial in 6 parts based on the novel by Peter Dickinson, who adapted the book. It features Ian Sharp, Carol Hazell, and Mollie Sugden and was directed by Anna Home. and Paul Stone.

A group of present-day children become caught up in a conflict between two groups from the future who have come back into the present.

The significance of the title is that the mind of one person of the future is transferred into the family pet dog of one of the children.

Cast
Jane Anthony as Sammy
Carol Hazell as Kate
Adrian Shergold as Duncan
Ian Sharp as Ian
Jonathan Hardy as Halmar
Roy Boyd as Henry
Derek Martin as Gala One
Mollie Sugden as Mrs. Morris

References

External links 
 

1972 British television series debuts
BBC children's television shows
1970s British children's television series
1972 British television series endings
English-language television shows
1970s British science fiction television series